Josef Emanuel Hubertus "Sepp" Piontek (born 5 March 1940) is a German former footballer and manager.

Playing career
Born in Breslau, now Wrocław. Piontek started his playing career with VfL Germania Leer. Between 1963 and 1972, the full-back played 203 Bundesliga matches with 14 goals for SV Werder Bremen (he previously registered 75 matches and one goal with the side in Oberliga Nord (1960–1963), prior to the creation of Bundesliga), adding six caps (no goals) for the West German national team.

Coaching career
After retiring he managed, in Germany, Werder Bremen (1971–1975), and later Fortuna Düsseldorf (1975–1976) and FC St. Pauli (1978–1979). In 1979, Piontek became Danish national team coach after having previously managed Haiti (1976–1978). He sat through 115 international matches, leading Denmark to their first ever World Cup participation in the 1986 tournament. His period as national team coach came just after the introduction of professional players in the national team, and under his reign the Denmark team became known as "Danish Dynamite". He quit as Denmark coach in April 1990 after the Danish national team failed to qualify for 1990 FIFA World Cup, and later coached Turkey from an advice by fellow German and Piontek's teacher Jupp Derwall from May 1990 to 1993, in which though failed to qualify for neither UEFA Euro 1992 and 1994 FIFA World Cup, helped sparking a massive revival in Turkish football fortunes which would be witnessed by the time Piontek left.

In the 1990s, Piontek returned to Denmark, where he coached Danish clubs Aalborg BK and Silkeborg IF, and subsequently worked with the Greenland national team. He currently earns a living as a lecturer.

Honours

Player
Werder Bremen
 Bundesliga: 1964–65, runners-up 1967–68
 DFB-Pokal: 1961

Manager 
Individual

 Guerin Sportivo Manager of the Year: 1983

References

External links

 Danish national team profile 
 
 
 Sepp Piontek Interview
 German foundation beneath Turkey's rise to greatness
 The forgotten story of...Danish Dynamite, the Denmark side of the mid-80s 

Living people
1940 births
Association football defenders
Sportspeople from Wrocław
People from the Province of Lower Silesia
German footballers
Germany international footballers
Germany B international footballers
Germany under-21 international footballers
Bundesliga players
SV Werder Bremen players
German football managers
UEFA Euro 1984 managers
1986 FIFA World Cup managers
UEFA Euro 1988 managers
SV Werder Bremen managers
Fortuna Düsseldorf managers
FC St. Pauli managers
Haiti national football team managers
Denmark national football team managers
Turkey national football team managers
Bursaspor managers
AaB Fodbold managers
Silkeborg IF managers
Bundesliga managers
2. Bundesliga managers
West German expatriate sportspeople in Denmark
German expatriate sportspeople in Turkey
Expatriate football managers in Denmark
Expatriate football managers in Haiti
Expatriate football managers in Turkey
West German expatriate sportspeople in Haiti
West German expatriate football managers
West German footballers
West German football managers
German expatriate football managers